Nadiem Anwar Makarim (born 4 July 1984) is an Indonesian politician and businessman who is the current minister of education, culture, research, and technology of Indonesia. 

Prior to entering politics, in 2010, he founded Gojek, Indonesia's first startup valued over US$10 billion. In October 2019, he was appointed as Minister of Education and Culture by President Joko Widodo on his second term's cabinet and subsequently resigned from his post at Gojek.

Personal life 
Nadiem was born in Singapore on 4 July 1984, to Indonesian parents Nono Anwar Makarim and Atika Algadri. His father is an activist, lawyer and is of Minangkabau-Arabian descent. His maternal grandfather is Hamid Algadri. He has two sisters, Hana Makarim, and Rayya Makarim known as a filmmaker. He married Franka Franklin and they have two daughters.

Education 
Nadiem attended high school in Jakarta and United World College of Southeast Asia (UWC SEA), Singapore, and then went to Brown University for a BA in International Relations. He did his MBA at Harvard Business School.

Business career 

Nadiem started his career at McKinsey & Company as management consultant in Jakarta. He left to co-found Zalora, an online fashion shop, then left Zalora to become Chief Innovation Officer at Kartuku, a payment service provider.

2006–2009: McKinsey & Company  
After graduating from Brown University in 2006, Nadiem decided to come back home to Indonesia and worked at McKinsey & Company. Nadiem worked as a McKinsey consultant for 3 years.

2011–2012: Zalora Indonesia 
Nadiem became co-founder and managing director for Zalora Indonesia in 2011. In 2012, Nadiem made the decision to leave Zalora to focus on building his own startup, including Gojek, which at that time had 15 employees and 450 drivers. He claims to have learned enough from Zalora, which was his main goal in accepting the position in the first place. In Zalora, Nadiem had the chance to build a mega startup and work with some of the best talents across the region.

2013–2014: Kartuku 
After leaving Zalora and while developing Gojek, Nadiem also worked as a chief innovation officer of Kartuku. In the early days, Kartuku didn't have any competition in cashless payment solutions in Indonesia. Kartuku was then acquired by Gojek to strengthen GoPay.

2010–2019: Gojek  
In 2010 Nadiem created Gojek, which is today a decacorn company with a valuation of over US$10 billion. Gojek was first established as a call centre, offering only courier delivery and two-wheeled ride-hailing services. Today, Gojek has transformed into a super app, providing more than 20 services, ranging from transportation, food delivery, groceries, massage, house cleaning, logistics to a cashless digital  payment platform called GoPay.

Nadiem often uses a motorcycle taxi, known in Indonesia as an ojek. He saw this as a business opportunity and developed it into Gojek, which is founded in 2010.

Gojek was well received, and eventually received US$1,3 billion funding from investors, in a 2018-round led by Alphabet Inc's Google, JD.com Inc and Tencent Holdings. It thereby became the first Indonesian unicorn. By 2019, the firm was worth up to US$10 billion

On 21 October 2019, Gojek announced that Nadiem would leave the company to join president-elect Jokowi's Onward Indonesia Cabinet. His position as CEO was replaced by Gojek group president Andre Soelistyo and Gojek co-founder Kevin Aluwi as co-CEOs.  On the second reshuffle of the cabinet, announced at 28 April 2021, he was appointed as the first holder of Minister of Education, Culture, Research, and Technology.

Ministerial career

2019–present:  Minister of Education, Culture, Research, and Technology 
Under Nadiem's tenure as Minister of Education and Culture, a decree prohibiting Indonesian schools from enforcing rules mandating the wearing of religious attire was signed into effect on February 3, 2021. Schools were given 30 days to repeal any rules making the wearing of religious attire compulsory before they would face sanctions. Nadiem supported the ban, stating that whether a person should wear religious clothing is "an individual's right… it is not the school's decision."

Awards 
 In 2016, Nadiem received The Straits Times Asian of the Year award and was the first Indonesian to receive the award since it was first established in 2012.
 In 2018, Nadiem made it to Bloomberg 50 annual list of innovators. Bloomberg wrote that there was no other technology platform (app) that changed the lives of Indonesian as fast and as integrated as Gojek.
 In May 2019, Nadiem was the youngest figure from Asia to receive the 24th Nikkei Asia Prize for economic and business innovation. Nadiem doubled the prize to Rp 860 million and donated the amount as education scholarship for Gojek drivers’ children. Gojek contributed Rp 55 trillion (US$3.85 Billion) towards the Indonesian economy, with the average income of GoRide and GoCar partners increasing by 45% and 42% after joining Gojek, and culinary SMEs transaction volume increasing 55% after becoming GoFood merchant.
 In 2017, Gojek made it to Fortune's Top 50 Companies That Changed The World, ranking 17th worldwide. In 2019 Gojek once again made it to Fortune's Top 50 Companies That Changed The World, and was the only Southeast Asian company to have been included twice in the list - this year leaping to number 11 out of 52 global companies.
 In November 2019, Nadiem was the only Indonesian to be included on 100 Next list for Leaders category by the Time magazine.  Time's 100 Next list this year is to recognize the influence of rising stars who are shaping the future in their respective fields.

International organizations 
With Melinda Gates and the Minister of Finance of Indonesia, Sri Mulyani, Nadiem served as one of the commissioners of Pathways for Prosperity for Technology and Inclusive Development that focuses on helping developing countries to adapt with various new digital innovations that change the working culture.

References 

Brown University alumni
Harvard Business School alumni
Indonesian businesspeople
1984 births
Indonesian Muslims
Indonesian people of Arab descent
Indonesian people of Yemeni descent
Minangkabau people
Hadhrami people
Living people
Education ministers of Indonesia
Onward Indonesia Cabinet
Winners of the Nikkei Asia Prize
People educated at a United World College